Vyborgskaya is a station of the Saint Petersburg Metro. It was opened on 22 April 1975.

Saint Petersburg Metro stations
Railway stations in Russia opened in 1975
Railway stations located underground in Russia